Visible Ink Press, LLC is a publisher of popular reference works. Its headquarters are in Canton Charter Township, Michigan in Metro Detroit. It was founded in 1989 as an imprint of Gale and later spun-off as an independent company in 2000. The Handy Answer Book Series is published by Visible Ink, as were the MusicHound Essential Album Guides.

Robert Jackson of the Rocky Mountain News said in 1994 that Visible Ink Press had an annual tradition of "releasing quality books that deal with people of color".

References

External links

American companies established in 1989
Book publishing companies of the United States
Companies based in Michigan
Wayne County, Michigan
1989 establishments in Michigan
Publishing companies established in 1989